Carol William "Cully" Wilson (June 5, 1892 – July 7, 1962) was an Icelandic-Canadian professional ice hockey player. The right winger played in the National Hockey League (NHL) for the Toronto St. Pats, Montreal Canadiens, Hamilton Tigers, and Chicago Black Hawks between 1919 and 1927. He was also a member of two teams that won the Stanley Cup before the NHL came into existence in 1917, the Toronto Blueshirts and Seattle Metropolitans.

Wilson came from a family of Icelandic descent and was born as Karl Wilhons Erlendson to parents Sigurður Erlendson and Medónía Indriðadóttir. The family later changed its name to Wilson.

Career
Wilson played amateur hockey in his hometown of Winnipeg between 1910 and 1912, with the Winnipeg Falcons and the Winnipeg Monarchs. He began his professional career with the National Hockey Association's Toronto Blueshirts in 1912–13. The next year, he won his first Stanley Cup when the Blueshirts beat the Montreal Canadiens in the NHA playoffs. He was a part of the "first" expansion of professional hockey when the Pacific Coast Hockey Association agreed to compete with the NHA in an east-west rivalry for the Stanley Cup championship. As a member of the Seattle Metropolitans, Wilson won the Stanley Cup for a second time in 1917, again beating the Montreal Canadiens.

Wilson signed with the National Hockey League's Toronto St. Pats in 1919, after having been expelled from the PCHA for a cheap shot on Mickey MacKay. In the NHL he also played briefly for the Montreal Canadiens, on a loan from the St. Patricks, and with the Hamilton Tigers. He left the NHL after the 1922–23 season and headed west to play for the Calgary Tigers of the Western Canada Hockey League.

Wilson returned to the NHL for one more season in 1926–27 after the WCHL folded and his rights were traded to the Chicago Black Hawks. After a disappointing year with the Black Hawks, Wilson moved on to the American Hockey Association's St. Paul Saints. Over the next three years he played and coached with the Saints before moving on to the San Francisco Tigers of the Cal-Pro League and the Duluth Hornets of the AHA. His last season was the 1931–32 season with the Kansas City Pla-Mors.

Wilson played an aggressive and rough style of hockey, both giving and receiving in the physical aspect of the game, similar to a modern day pest. As a result, he received a fair amount of slashes and cuts to his face. During the 1919 PCHA season, in a game against the Vancouver Millionaires, Wilson fought for the puck against Millionaires center Mickey MacKay and slashed him over the mouth. MacKay suffered a fractured jaw and missed the rest of the season. When the season was over PCHA chief disciplinarian Frank Patrick banned Wilson from the league. Wilson led three different leagues in penalty minutes in different seasons: 1914–15 in the NHA, 1919 in the PCHA, and 1919–20 in the NHL.

Wilson died in 1962 and is buried in Evergreen-Washelli Cemetery in Seattle.

Statistics

Regular season and playoffs

Awards and achievements
Stanley Cup championships (1914, 1917)
PCHA First All-Star Team (1919)
WCHL Second All-Star Team (1925)
In 2015, Wilson was inducted into the Manitoba Hockey Hall of Fame.

References
Society for International Hockey Research at sihrhockey.org

Notes

External links

1892 births
1962 deaths
Calgary Tigers players
Canadian ice hockey right wingers
Canadian people of Icelandic descent
Chicago Blackhawks players
Hamilton Tigers (ice hockey) players
Montreal Canadiens players
Seattle Metropolitans players
Ice hockey people from Winnipeg
Stanley Cup champions
St. Paul Saints (AHA) players
Toronto Blueshirts players
Toronto St. Pats players
Winnipeg Falcons players
Winnipeg Monarchs players